Epacris tasmanica is a species of flowering plant in the heath family Ericaceae and is endemic to Tasmania. It is an erect shrub with lance-shaped leaves and tube-shaped white flowers crowded in upper leaf axils.

Description

Taxonomy
Epacris tasmanica was first formally described in 1969 by Winifred Curtis in the journal Taxon.

Distribution
This epacris is endemic to Tasmania where it is common and widespread in the east of the state, where it grows in stony soil at low altitudes.

References

tasmanica
Taxa named by Robert Brown (botanist, born 1773)
Plants described in 1969
Flora of Tasmania